Sarah Macdonald (born 1966) is an Australian journalist, author and radio presenter, and has been associated with several ABC radio programs, including Triple J and Radio National. She is also known for her book Holy Cow! An Indian Adventure.

Early life and education
Macdonald was born in Crown Street, Surry Hills, an inner-city suburb of Sydney, in 1966.

She studied psychology at university, before engaging in extensive travel.

Career
After completing a cadetship at ABC NewsRadio, Macdonald worked as Triple J's political correspondent in Canberra, later hosting its morning show. She worked on television programs such as Recovery (on air 1996–2000), Race Around the World (1997–1998) and Two Shot. 

In 2000, Macdonald left Triple J to live in New Delhi, India, with her husband (ABC foreign correspondent Jonathan Harley) and wrote her first book, Holy Cow! An Indian Adventure (published 2002), which proved to be a best-seller, selling 75,000 copies.

From 2005 Macdonald took over from Julie McCrossin as presenter of breakfast radio on 702 ABC in (now ABC Radio Sydney), for a few months in late 2005.

She has also written for numerous publications, and created and presented the Weekend Nightlife Show.

From August 2016 to December 2018 Mcdonald co-presented a podcast, The Full Catastrophe, with author Rebecca Huntley, in which numerous people tell their own stories, including Larissa Behrendt, Frank Moorhouse, Jane Caro, and Susan Carland. She co-presented an event called "The Full Catastrophe" at the Wheeler Centre in Melbourne with Huntley in June 2018, with guests Maxine McKew, Sami Shah, Libbi Gorr, and Giselle Au-Nhien Nguyen.

 Macdonald was presenting Evenings on ABC Radio Sydney.

Personal life
Mcdonald is married to journalist Jonathan Harley, whom she met in the 1990s. He worked on ABC's The 7:30 Report in 2005, when she was working on breakfast radio, at which time they had two children under three years old.

Publications
 
 
 
  with Cathy Wilcox

References

External links
  Holy Cow! An Indian Adventure - publisher's information.

Australian radio journalists
Australian women journalists
Australian radio presenters
Australian women radio presenters
Australian memoirists
Living people
Triple J announcers
Australian women memoirists
Women radio journalists
1966 births